Corfe Castle was a parliamentary borough in Dorset, which elected two Members of Parliament (MPs) to the House of Commons from 1572 until 1832, when it was abolished by the Great Reform Act.

History
Corfe Castle was made a borough by Queen Elizabeth I, through the influence of Sir Christopher Hatton, who had been granted the manor. The borough consisted of the town of Corfe Castle on the Isle of Purbeck, once a market town but by the 19th century little more than a village, where the main economic interests were clay and stone quarrying. In 1831, the population of the borough was approximately 960, in 156 houses. (The portion of the town outside the borough contained another 141 houses.)

The right to vote was exercised by all householders (resident or not) paying scot and lot; in 1816 this amounted to only 44 voters, and all but 14 of those were non-resident. The local landowners were able to exercise almost total influence. In the late 18th and early 19th century, the Bankes family (who had owned the castle since 1640) nominated the member for one of the seats and the Bond family for the other.

Corfe Castle was abolished as a separate constituency by the Reform Act; however, the nearby borough of Wareham kept one of its MPs, and Corfe Castle was included within the expanded boundaries of the revised Wareham constituency.

Members of Parliament

1572–1640

1640–1832

Notes

References 
Robert Beatson, A Chronological Register of Both Houses of Parliament (London: Longman, Hurst, Res & Orme, 1807)
D. Brunton & D. H. Pennington, Members of the Long Parliament (London: George Allen & Unwin, 1954)
Cobbett's Parliamentary history of England, from the Norman Conquest in 1066 to the year 1803 (London: Thomas Hansard, 1808) 
 Maija Jansson (ed.), Proceedings in Parliament, 1614 (House of Commons) (Philadelphia: American Philosophical Society, 1988)
 J. Holladay Philbin, Parliamentary Representation 1832 - England and Wales (New Haven: Yale University Press, 1965)
Henry Stooks Smith, "The Parliaments of England from 1715 to 1847" (2nd edition, edited by F. W. S. Craig - Chichester: Parliamentary Reference Publications, 1973)
 

Parliamentary constituencies in Dorset (historic)
Constituencies of the Parliament of the United Kingdom established in 1572
Constituencies of the Parliament of the United Kingdom disestablished in 1832
Rotten boroughs
Corfe Castle